Imtiaz Anees (born 25 December 1970) is an Indian equestrian. He competed in the individual eventing at the 2000 Summer Olympics in Sydney and finished 23rd overall.

References

External links
 

1970 births
Living people
Indian male equestrians
Olympic equestrians of India
Equestrians at the 2000 Summer Olympics
Place of birth missing (living people)
Asian Games medalists in equestrian
Equestrians at the 1998 Asian Games
Asian Games bronze medalists for India
Medalists at the 1998 Asian Games